Guinea Town is an early free Black community that was formed with the help of Hicksite Quakers in Old Westbury, New York in 1793 and remained active until just after the Civil War.

History 
Guinea Town played a part in transporting runaway enslaved Africans to Dartmouth, Nova Scotia, which was a Quaker community. Eliakim Levi was a leader in the Black community of Guinea Town, in New York and a conductor with the Hicksite's on the Underground Railroad. Hicksites were Quakers who were followers of Elias Hicks. The Hicks family gave land to establish Guinea Town, the early free black community in Old Westbury, New York.

Elias Hicks was instrumental in ensuring the opening, On April 27, 1817, of a primary school and Sunday school for Blacks in the Westbury neighborhood then known as Guinea Town, near today's Glen Cove Road and the southwestern corner of the access road to the Long Island Expressway.By 1830, the community had its own church. 

In 2005 the Black Ice Project/Underground Railroad project was created to identify connections between slavery, safe houses in Brooklyn, transit through Guinea Town, and ex-slaves who played hockey in Canada. The project works towards identify Quaker families, free Africans and runaway slaves that were part of the 1800s underground railroad network.

References

African-American historic places
Former towns in New York (state)
Hyde Park, New York
Populated places disestablished in 1850
Populated places established in the 1790s
1850 disestablishments in New York (state)
1790s establishments in New York (state)
Populated places in New York established by African Americans
Underground Railroad in New York (state)